Global Underground 029: Sharam, Dubai is a DJ mix album in the Global Underground series, compiled and mixed by Iranian-American DJ and producer Sharam Tayebi of the house music duo Deep Dish.

As darlings of the GU faithful, Deep Dish could do no wrong, so Sharam’s solo return to the label was greeted with much joy. As an exercise in pointing out how his and Dubfire’s tastes differ – and what they each brought to the celebrated DD partnership – this double CD can be held up against Dubfire’s later GU031 for a fascinating insight.

Sharam isn’t afraid of vocals and occasional pop sensibilities, but remains true to the underground spirit of the series with a flawless mix. His choice of the latest clubbing frontier - the fast rising Gulf city of Dubai - sits well with his own personal new era. Bold new music for the glitzy new metropolis.

Track listing

Disc 1 - The Club
DYAD10 - "Sugar (Sweet Thing) (Nicka & Alse Remix)"
Spider & Legaz - "Look Around (Spider Funk Dub)"
16 Bit Lolitas - "Passing Lights"
Syntax – "Bliss (Felix Da Housecat Remix)"
Spider & Legaz - "Majorca Roots"
Paul van Dyk feat. Wayne Jackson - "The Other Side" (Deep Dish Other Than This Side Remix)"
Lunascape - "Mindstalking (Dave Audé Dub)"
Jiva feat. Rula – "Timelapse (Moonbeam pres Glockenspiel Mix)"
Sultan & Ned Shepard - "Together We Rise"
16 Bit Lolitas vs. Motorcycle – "Deep Breath Sedna (Dave Dresden Mash-up)"
Creamer & K feat. Nadia Ali & Rosko - "Something to Lose"(Cedric Gervais Remix)"
Crime Mob - "Stilettos (Pumps) featuring Miss Aisha (Dave Audé Pumps Dub)"
Pig & Dan - "Eiffel Nights"

Disc 2 - The Hub
The Reese Project - "Direct Me (Joey Negro Remix)"
Pete Heller Presents Timewarp - "Timewarp"
Cedric Gervais feat. Caroline - "Spirit In My Life"
Miss Nine - "Everlasting"
Sultan & Ned Shepard feat. Stereomovers - "Connected (Spider & Legaz Remix)"
Simon & Shaker – "Zero"
Suite 117 - "Smaller (Dave Audé Remix)"
Spider & Legaz - "Psych"
Twotrups - "The Cello Track (Dub)"
Armin Van Buuren feat. Nadia Ali - "Who is Watching"
Casa Grande - "El Ayoun"
Nicolas Bacher - "Manitou"
Acquaviva & Maddox - "Feedback (Valentino Kanzyani Earresistable Mix)"
Planet Funk - "Everyday"

References

External links 
Official Release Information from Global Underground News Page

Global Underground
2006 compilation albums
Sharam albums
Deep Dish (band) compilation albums